The 2022 A-League Women grand final was the final match of the 2021–22 A-League Women season, played on 27 March 2022 between Sydney FC and Melbourne Victory at Jubilee Oval (Kogorah Oval) in Sydney. Melbourne won the match 2–1.

The win made Melbourne the second club to win back-to-back A-League Women championships, and was their third title overall. It was Sydney's fifth consecutive Grand Final appearance. It was Melbourne Victory's third win in four finals against Sydney.

Teams

Route to the final

Finals

Sydney qualified for the Grand Final directly, by defeating Melbourne City in a playoff between the top two. Melbourne qualified after winning sudden death games against Adelaide United and Melbourne City.

Match

Details

Broadcasting
The match was broadcast nationally on 10 Bold and streamed by 10Play and Paramount+.

References 

Grand Final
Soccer in Sydney
A-League Women Grand Finals